Sihri or Sihiri  is a small village located in Punahana Tehsil of Nuh district in the Haryana state, India. Sihri is 5 km away from Punahana the nearest city. The Village is located at the bottom of a small hillock, in an area shaped like the letter "C". The literacy rate is around 55—60%. There is one government high school shared by two village, Sihri And Singalheri.The local government system, or Gram panchayat, is common to both villages. It is around 25 km away from National Highway 2, which runs from Delhi to Mathura.

Geography and Climate
Sihri is surrounded by number of small villages like Laharwari, Singalheri, Jaimat, Ghusinha, Jamalgarh, Luhingha and Piproli. Sihri is very close to a small river which was inaugurated by former Haryana chief minister Chaudhary Devi Lal. This river is also the seasonal source of irrigation in nearby villages. This river is mainly a drainage for outskirts of Gurgaon and Ballabhgarh cities but serves irrigation and other agricultural related purposes in this area. Village witnesses lush greenery in winter season and land goes dry in summers. In Summer temperature goes as high as 45 °C and in winter temperature generally lies in the range of 7° to 20 °C sometime falling as low as 0 °C.

In May 2009, after months of media and public protests, supported by several environmental groups, the Supreme Court banned mining in a 448 km2 area across the Faridabad, Gurgaon and Mewat districts in Haryana. Previously reserved for national park lands, the change followed an earlier judgment in 1994 which allowed limited mining on the basis of the sustainable development principle, and under strict guidelines. The court ruled that these principles had been violated by local miners.

However, there are many illegal mines in Rajasthan, some of them operating at the edges of the Sariska Tiger Reserve.

Gallery

Nearby Towns

 Pinangwan
 Punahana
 Nuh

References

External links
 History of Haryana
 People Of Haryana 

Villages in Nuh district
Mewat